Poisson Hill is a rounded ice-free hill rising to 80 m at the north extremity of Breznik Heights, Greenwich Island in the South Shetland Islands, Antarctica and surmounting the Chilean Antarctic base Arturo Prat to the west-southwest.  Angamos Hill (55 m) is lying 370 m north-northeast of it and 850 m south-southeast of Ash Point.

Poisson Hill was charted by the 1947 Chilean Antarctic Expedition and named after Sub-Lieutenant Maurice Poisson who signed the official act of inauguration of Arturo Prat Base in 1947, while Angamos Hill was named after that expedition's transport ship Angamos.

Location

Maps
 L.L. Ivanov et al. Antarctica: Livingston Island and Greenwich Island, South Shetland Islands. Scale 1:100000 topographic map. Sofia: Antarctic Place-names Commission of Bulgaria, 2005.
 L.L. Ivanov. Antarctica: Livingston Island and Greenwich, Robert, Snow and Smith Islands. Scale 1:120000 topographic map.  Troyan: Manfred Wörner Foundation, 2009.

References
 Composite Antarctic Gazetteer.

Hills of Greenwich Island